Madurese is a language of the Madurese people, native to the Madura Island and Eastern Java, Indonesia; it is also spoken by migrants to other parts of Indonesia, namely the eastern salient of Java (comprising Pasuruan, Surabaya, Malang to Banyuwangi), the Masalembu Islands and even some on Kalimantan. It was traditionally written in the Javanese script, but the Latin script and the Pegon script (based on Arabic script) is now more commonly used. The number of speakers, though shrinking, is estimated to be 8–13 million, making it one of the most widely spoken languages in the country. Bawean Madurese, which is a dialect of Madurese, also spoken by Baweanese descendants in Malaysia and Singapore.

Madurese is a Malayo-Sumbawan language of the Malayo-Polynesian language family, a branch of the larger Austronesian language family. Thus, despite apparent geographic spread, Madurese is more related to Balinese, Malay, Sasak and Sundanese, than it is to Javanese, the language used on the island of Java just across Madura Island.

Links between Bali–Sasak languages and Madurese are more evident with the vernacular form (common form).

Phonology
Latin letters are given according to the 2008 orthography.

Vowels

Consonants 

Madurese has more consonants than its neighboring languages due to it having voiceless unaspirated, voiceless aspirated (traditionally often transcribed as voiced aspirated), and voiced unaspirated. Similar to Javanese, it has a contrast between dental and alveolar (even retroflex) stops.

Morphology
Madurese nouns are not inflected for gender and are pluralized via reduplication. Its basic word order is subject–verb–object. Negation is expressed by putting a negative particle before the verb, adjective or noun phrase. As with other similar languages, there are different negative particles for different kinds of negation.

Common words

Numerals

Sample text
From Article 1 of the 1948 Universal Declaration of Human Rights.

References

Bibliography

 
 

 
Malayo-Polynesian languages
Languages of Indonesia
Languages of Singapore
Languages of Malaysia
Madura Island